Tibor Halilović (born 18 March 1995) is a Croatian professional footballer who plays as midfielder for Eredivisie club Heerenveen. He is a cousin of Alen Halilović.

Club career
On 23 June 2017 Halilović signed a contract with Wisła Kraków in Poland.

Rijeka
On 22 January 2019, Halilović signed a -year contract with HNK Rijeka in Croatia with a one-year extension option.

Halilović scored the only goal of the Croatian Cup Final against his former club Lokomotiva on 1 August 2020, securing Rijeka their second consecutive Croatian Cup title.

Heerenveen 
On 11 January 2021, Halilović signed with SC Heerenveen until 2024.

Honours
Rijeka
Croatian Cup: 2018–19, 2019–20

References

External links
 
 

1995 births
Living people
Footballers from Zagreb
Croatian footballers
Association football midfielders
GNK Dinamo Zagreb II players
NK Lokomotiva Zagreb players
Wisła Kraków players
HNK Rijeka players
SC Heerenveen players
Croatian Football League players
Ekstraklasa players
Eredivisie players
Croatian expatriate footballers
Expatriate footballers in Poland
Croatian expatriate sportspeople in Poland
Expatriate footballers in the Netherlands
Croatian expatriate sportspeople in the Netherlands